Scythropia crataegella, the hawthorn moth, is a species of moth in the family Plutellidae from western Eurasia. It is usually placed in a small subfamily Scythropiinae, which is sometimes included in the Yponomeutinae of the Yponomeutidae.

Described as Phalaena crataegella by Linnaeus in 1767, it was made the type species of Scythropia, the only Scythropiinae genus currently recognized, by Jacob Hübner in the 1820s. Initially (in 1796), Hübner had misidentified the grass moth Eudonia lacustrata – much larger and only distantly related, but somewhat similar in color and pattern – as Linnaeus' Phalaena crataegella. Similarly, a junior synonym of this species, Tinea cornella, has frequently been misapplied – and sometimes still is even today – to the fairly closely related apple blossom tineid.

Description and ecology
S. crataegella is a small moth is widespread almost all over Europe; it is absent from Great Britain north of The Lake District, and has also not been recorded yet on Iceland and Ireland (where it is probably genuinely absent), in Portugal (where it may be absent), and in Slovenia (where it probably occurs but has not been found yet, as its range includes the surrounding countries). It is quite common throughout its range. The nocturnal adults are attracted to light sources; on Great Britain they are only commonly seen in July, but elsewhere they may be found from late May to September and have two generations per year.

The wingspan of adults is 11–15 mm. As usual for the Yponomeutidae, the forewings have a bold black-and-white pattern: two thick but irregular black bands divide the white forewings into roughly equal inner, middle and outer parts, and the white between the bands has numerous small black spots. The hindwings are dusky greyish-brown and unadorned. The body is whitish. The caterpillar larvae feed in large groups from the safety of a silken web they produce together; young larvae are leaf miners. The mainstay food is leaves of Crataegus (hawthorn), hence the species' name. But they have also been recorded from other Amygdaloideae, e.g. blackthorn (Prunus spinosa) and other Prunus species, Cotoneaster, as well as Malus sylvestris and Pyrus (pear).

References

 Fauna Europaea (FE) (2009a): Argyresthia (Argyresthia) curvella. Version 2.1, 2009-DEC-22. Retrieved 2010-MAY-05.
 Fauna Europaea (FE) (2009b): Scythropia crataegella. Version 2.1, 2009-DEC-22. Retrieved 2010-MAY-05.
 Kimber, Ian [2010]: UKMoths – Scythropia crataegella. Retrieved 2010-MAY-05.
 Pitkin, Brian & Jenkins, Paul (2004a): Butterflies and Moths of the World, Generic Names and their Type-species – Dipleurina. Version of 2004-NOV-05. Retrieved 2011-OCT-14.
 Pitkin, Brian & Jenkins, Paul (2004b): Butterflies and Moths of the World, Generic Names and their Type-species – Scythropia. Version of 2004-NOV-05. Retrieved 2010-MAY-05.
 Savela, Markku (2001): Markku Savela's Lepidoptera and some other life forms – Scythropia. Version of 2001-NOV-05. Retrieved 2010-MAY-05.

External links

 waarneming.nl  
 Lepidoptera of Belgium 

Plutellidae
Moths described in 1767
Moths of Asia
Moths of Europe
Taxa named by Carl Linnaeus